No. 237 Operational Conversion Unit was a Royal Air Force Operational conversion unit.

Operational history

 First formation: 31 July 1947 - 1 December 1951
 Second formation: 23 October 1956 - 21 January 1958
 Third formation: 1 March 1971 - 1 October 1991

Future identity

Buccaneer Training Flight RAF within No. 208 Squadron RAF at RAF Lossiemouth (1 October 1991 - 1992)

Previous identities

 No. 8 OTU No. 8 Operational Training Unit RAF (18 May 1942 - 31 July 1947)
 PRU Conversion Flight of No. 3 School of General Reconnaissance RAF (February 1942 - 13 May 1942)
 No. 3 School of General Reconnaissance RAF (16 December 1940 - 1 May 1946)
 No. 2 School of General Reconnaissance RAF (28 May 1940 - 16 December 1940)
 No. 1 School of General Reconnaissance RAF (19 June 1940 - 30 September 1940)
 School of General Reconnaissance RAF (4 April 1938 -  19 June 1940 & 1 March 1946 - 5 September 1947)
 K Flight of No. 1 Photographic Reconnaissance Unit RAF (23 January 1942 - 1 August 1942)

See also
 List of conversion units of the Royal Air Force

References

Citations

Bibliography

Military units and formations established in 1947
Conversion units of the Royal Air Force